Belokholunitsky District is an administrative and municipal district (raion), one of the thirty-nine in Kirov Oblast, Russia. It is located in the northeast of the oblast. Its administrative center is the town of Belaya Kholunitsa. Population:  23,232 (2002 Census);  The population of Belaya Kholunitsa accounts for 56.5% of the district's total population.

References

Notes

Sources

Districts of Kirov Oblast